was a Japanese football player. He played for Japan national team.

Club career
Iwabuchi was born in Tochigi Prefecture on November 17, 1933. He played for Keio BRB was consisted of his alma mater Keio University players and graduates. He won 1954 and 1956 Emperor's Cup at the club.

National team career
On January 5, 1955, when Iwabuchi was a Keio University student, he debuted for Japan national team against Burma. In June 1956, at 1956 Summer Olympics qualification against South Korea, he scored a goal. After the qualification, Japan won the qualification to 1956 Summer Olympics in Melbourne by the drawing of lots. In November, he was selected Japan for 1956 Olympics. He also played at 1958 Asian Games. He played 8 games and scored 2 goals for Japan until 1958.

On April 16, 2003, Iwabuchi died of peritonitis in Tokyo at the age of 69.

National team statistics

References

External links
 
 
 Japan National Football Team Database

1933 births
2003 deaths
Keio University alumni
Association football people from Tochigi Prefecture
Japanese footballers
Japan international footballers
Olympic footballers of Japan
Footballers at the 1956 Summer Olympics
Footballers at the 1958 Asian Games
Association football forwards
Asian Games competitors for Japan